Linda Lawton, Ph.D., FRSE is a Scottish researcher in microcystins and toxins produced by cyanobacteria and has researched into the impact of the so-called 'blue-green algae" from drinking water supply. Her detection method is now used worldwide and was used by the World Health Organisation to develop drinking water safety standards, scientists are trained in it from Sri Lanka to fish farms in Scotland, and Lawton is  investigating potential cancer treatments and positive uses such as digesting waste plastics in microbiology.  She was made a Fellow of the Royal Society of Edinburgh in 2021. Lawton is Professor of Environmental Biology at the Robert Gordon University, Aberdeen.

Education and career 
Lawton studied Brewing and Microbiology and Heriot Watt University, Edinburgh and began her academic career in microbiology in the 1980s at the University of Surrey Center for Environmental Strategy. She then worked at Dundee University, for seven years and also obtained her PhD on "biological effects & significance of cyanobacterial peptide toxins", bringing a focus on cyanobacteria for the past 30 years. She became  group research leader at Robert Gordon University (RGU) Aberdeen in 1994, and Full Professor in 2007, and is widely cited with substantial network of international collaborators including commercial partnerships. She lives in Stonehaven.

Research and publications 
Lawton's research group investigates cyanobacteria and algae and water treatment, photocatalysis and novel biofuels.  She has 159 publications to date with 5985 citations,  and has been invited to write book chapters and present to learned societies and research conferences globally. Lawton's research has been reported both in local press and nationally recognised in a political magazine as leading one of the breakthrough projects in Scotland, and also gave 'fun' science communications on biochemistry.

Her formal list of research funding awards  which is estimated to be over £10million to date,  and publications are on Orcid or Researchgate  A recent £1.4million collaboration with Queen's Belfast and St. Andrew's colleagues, under the banner of CyanoSol is looking at "in reservoir destruction of blue-green algae and their toxins".

References 

Fellows of the Royal Society of Edinburgh
British microbiologists
Academics of Robert Gordon University
Year of birth missing (living people)
Living people